"R U Ready" is a song by American hip hop girl group Salt-N-Pepa from their fifth studio album, Brand New (1997). It was released as the album's lead single. The song contains excerpts from "Watch Out" by Brass Construction.

Track listings
CD single
"R U Ready" (Album Version) – 3:50
"R U Ready" (Party Mix) – 3:59
"R U Ready" (Album Instrumental Version) – 3:50
"R U Ready" (Party Instrumental Mix) – 3:59

12-inch single
A1. "R U Ready" (Album Version) 
A2. "R U Ready" (Album Instrumental Version) 
B1. "R U Ready" (Party Mix) 
B2. "R U Ready" (Party Instrumental Mix) 
B3. "R U Ready" (Acappella)

Charts

References

1997 songs
1997 singles
Salt-N-Pepa songs
London Records singles
Music videos directed by Paul Hunter (director)